The London and North Eastern Railway (LNER) operated various classes steam locomotives with a 4-6-2 (or pacific) wheel arrangement.  The LNER operated more pacifics than any other of the Big Four British railway companies, and they were mostly used for express passenger work along the East Coast Main Line, though later in their lives many were displaced to other lines.

Overview 

In 1923, the LNER inherited four pacifics, to two classes each consisting of two locomotives, one class from either of two of its constituents, the Great Northern Railway (GNR) and the North Eastern Railway (NER).  The Great Northern Pacifics, were of GNR Class A1, designed by Nigel Gresley and numbered 1470/1.  The NER had completed two Pacifics, Nos 2400/1, designed by Vincent Raven.  The LNER adopted the GNR classification system by wheel arrangement, with the A-prefix indicating the most prestigious wheel arrangement.  The GNR Class A1s remained Class A1 and the NER Pacifics were reclassified A2.

The LNER also classified Pacific tank engines with A-numbers, and these were initially classified A5-7, and were eventually joined by a class A8. However, because of their different lineage and operational use, they are not further considered here.

The LNER completed an additional three A2s in 1924.  In 1929 2404 City of Ripon was fitted with a modified A1 boiler, but otherwise the A2s bore little resemblance to the remaining LNER Pacifics which were the continued evolution of the same basic Gresley design.  The Raven Class A2s were all withdrawn from stock in 1936/7, freeing the A2 designation for later reuse.

Comparisons between the A1 and A2s revealed the A1s to be superior, so they were selected for more building.  A total of 52 A1s were eventually built.  From 1928, the A1s were started to be fitted with a higher pressure superheated boiler.  This reboilering took them into Class A3, and eventually all but one of the 52 A1s would be rebuilt to Class A3, the process taking until 1948.  In addition, a total of 27 new A3s (Nos 2743-2752, 2595-2599, 2500-2508, 2795,2796,2797) were built.

In 1929 a single experimental Class W1 "Hush-Hush" locomotive was constructed.  The W1 was rebuilt in 1936 to a more conventional 4-6-4, retaining its W1 classification.  Although not technically not a Pacific, but a Hudson, there were many engineering similarities and operationally it shared similar duties.

The next class to be introduced was the Class A4 in 1935.  A total of 35 were built with large streamlined casing. One of these A4s,  4469 Sir Ralph Wedgwood was destroyed during the Baedeker raid during World War II.

Post-war, the initially straightforward classification system for LNER Pacifics started to break down.  In 1945, Edward Thompson rebuilt the first A1 Great Northern.  This was initially kept classified A1 and the few remaining A1s were reclassified A10.  The intention was always to rebuild the remaining A10s into A1s, however this was not done as the rebuild was not successful and they were instead rebuilt to A3s; the Class A10 becoming extinct in 1948.  Instead, a brand new class of 49 Peppercorn Class A1s were introduced in 1948/9, and in anticipation of these Great Northern was reclassified as Class A1/1 in 1947.

In 1943 and 1944 Thompson also rebuilt the Class P2s into Class A2/2s.  In 1944, Thompson built another subclass when another subclass of A2s originally ordered as V2s, these being the LNER Thompson Class A2/1.  Another fifteen new engines were built to a third design and classified A2/3.

Under the LNER's 1946 renumbering scheme, the Class A4s were given the lowest (i.e. most prestigious) numbers 1-34.  The A3s and few remaining A10s were renumbered 35-112 and the Thompson A1/1 Great Northern became No. 113.  The Thompson A2s were given 1946 numbers from rebuilding.  The A2/1 becoming 507-10, A2/2 501-6, and the A2/3 becoming 500/11-24.  A single Peppercorn Class A2, No. 525, was completed before nationalisation in 1948, but a further 6 were given LNER numbers (Nos 526-31) before BR decided on a numbering system.  BR then added 60000 to all LNER Pacific numbers, though it took a while to apply these.  The remaining Peppercorn Class A2s received their BR numbers 60532-9 from new, as did the LNER Peppercorn Class A1s which were numbered 60114-62.

Withdrawal 

Excluding the Raven Class A2s, and one A4 which was destroyed by bombing during the war, British Railways withdrew the LNER Pacifics from stock between 1959 and 1966.  The W1 (technically not a pacific by wheel arrangement but sharing many features) was withdrawn in 1959.

Preservation 

A total of eight original LNER Pacifics have been preserved; six of these are A4s (of which two are in North America), one A3 and one Peppercorn A2.

Tornado 

In addition to the preserved engines above, a new build Peppercorn Class A1, 60163 Tornado was completed in August 2008.

References 

 Railway Correspondence and Travel Society Locomotives of the LNER. Part 2A. Tender engines—classes A1 to A10. 1978. 231pp.
Willie Yeadon, Yeadon's Register of LNER Locomotives
 Vol.1: Gresley's A1, A3 Classes. Irwell Press, 1990
 Vol.2: Gresley A4 and W1 Classes. Irwell Press, 1990
 Vol.3: Raven, Thompson and Peppercorn Pacifics. Irwell Press, 1991

External links 
 LNER Encyclopedia

A*
4-6-2 locomotives